Trakai ('glades') is a common Lithuanian toponym. It may refer to:
Trakai, city in Lithuania, capital of Trakai District Municipality

Also to the villages in Lithuania:
 In Anykščiai District Municipality:
 Trakai, Troškūnai, in Troškūnai Eldership
 Trakai, Viešintos, in Viešintos Eldership
 Trakai, Ignalina, in Ignalina District Municipality
 Trakai, Jonava, in Jonava District Municipality
 Trakai, Jurbarkas, in Jurbarkas District Municipality
 In Kėdainiai District Municipality:
 Trakai, Krakės, in Krakės Eldership
 Trakai, Truskava, in Truskava Eldership
 Trakai, Marijampolė, in Marijampolė Municipality
 In Molėtai District Municipality:
 Trakai, Balninkai, in Balninkai Eldership
 Trakai, Joniškis, in Joniškis Eldership
 In Panevėžys District Municipality
 Trakai, Karsakiškis, in Karsakiškis Eldership
 Trakai, Naujamiestis, in Naujamiestis Eldership
 In Radviliškis District Municipality:
 Trakai, Grinkiškis, in Grinkiškis Eldership
 Trakai, Sidabravas, in Sidabravas Eldership
 Trakai, Šaukotas, in Šaukotas Eldership
 In Širvintos District Municipality:
 Trakai, Gelvonai, in Gelvonai Eldership
 Trakai, Musninkai, in Musninkai Eldership
 Trakai, Širvintos, in Širvintos Eldership
 In Švenčionys District Municipality:
 Trakai, Strūnaitis, in Strūnaitis Eldership
 Trakai, Švenčionys, in Švenčionys Eldership
 In Ukmergė District Municipality:
 Trakai, Pabaiskas, in Pabaiskas Eldership
 Trakai, Siesikai, in Siesikai Eldership
 In Trakai District Municipality
 Senieji Trakai 
 Trakai, Vilnius, in Vilnius District Municipality.